Neugebäude Palace is a large Mannerist castle complex in the Simmering district of Vienna, Austria. It was built from 1569 onwards, at the behest of the Habsburg emperor Maximilian II. The site of the palace is said to be where the Ottoman Sultan Süleyman the Magnificent's tent was erected during the 1529 Siege of Vienna. The palace was apparently modeled after it.

It fell into disuse already in the 17th century and today stands in ruins. Protected as a historical monument since the 1970s, there are various efforts to restore the site.

In 1922, Clemens Holzmeister's architectural designs for Austria's first crematorium placed Feuerhalle Simmering into the walled gardens of the derelict Schloss Neugebäude, thus putting the former palace gardens with its many ancient trees (designated natural monuments) to new use as urn burial ground.

References

External links 

 www.schlossneugebaeude.at

Houses completed in 1569
Buildings and structures in Simmering (Vienna)
Gardens in Austria
Landscape design history
Palaces in Vienna
Imperial residences in Austria
Tourist attractions in Vienna
1569 establishments in Austria
Maximilian II, Holy Roman Emperor